Artemia franciscana is a species of brine shrimp endemic to the Americas but now widely introduced throughout the tropics and temperate zones worldwide.

Several late embryogenesis abundant proteins have been identified in this species. See Menze et al., 2009, Sharon et al., 2009, Hand et al., 2007 and Chen et al., 2009 for LEA proteins in A. franciscana.

References

External links
 
 "Artemia franciscana", C. Drewes (updated, 2002), Iowa State University.

Anostraca